The Agra Savings Fund (1842) was a bank founded in the year 1842 in British India. The bank became defunct in the year 1863 with the winding down of its operations. The bank was notable for being the twenty fifth oldest bank in India.

History

Founding  

The Agra Savings Fund was founded in 1842 in Agra, India.

The bank largely served the customers of the United Provinces, which today corresponds to the Uttar Pradesh state of India.

Management 

The bank was staffed by mostly British nationals who were drawn mainly from the East India Company. Elizabeth Jahans (a European Portuguese woman residing in India) was one of the directors of the bank.

The bank was headquartered in the Agra city in the United Provinces.

Final years 

In 1862, the bank was on the verge of failure.

The bank was finally closed in the year 1863.

Legacy 

The bank is notable for being the twenty fifth oldest bank in India.

The bank played a key role in the history of Banking in India.

See also

Indian banking
List of banks in India

References

External links
 History of the bank by the Reserve Bank of India
 Book by Charles Northcote Cooke
 Economic History

Defunct banks of India
Companies based in Uttar Pradesh
Banks established in 1842